Sanja Ožegović (born 15 June 1959) is a former basketball player who competed for Yugoslavia in the 1980 Summer Olympics and in the 1984 Summer Olympics.

References

1959 births
Living people
Basketball players from Zagreb
Yugoslav women's basketball players
Croatian women's basketball players
Olympic basketball players of Yugoslavia
Basketball players at the 1980 Summer Olympics
Basketball players at the 1984 Summer Olympics
Olympic bronze medalists for Yugoslavia
Olympic medalists in basketball
Shooting guards
Medalists at the 1980 Summer Olympics